Sacaton (Pima: Geʼe Ki:) is a census-designated place (CDP) in Pinal County, Arizona, United States. The population was 3,254 at the 2020 census. It is the capital of the Gila River Indian Community.

Geography
Sacaton is located at  (33.079911, −111.745784).

Demographics

As of the census of 2000, there were 1,584 people, 378 households, and 303 families residing in the CDP. The racial makeup of the CDP was 2.0% White, 95.0% Native American, 0.1% Asian, 0.6% from other races, and 2.3% from two or more races.  7.1% of the population were Hispanic or Latino of any race.

There were 378 households, out of which 40.7% had children under the age of 18 living with them, 26.2% were married couples living together, 41.3% had a female householder with no husband present, and 19.6% were non-families. 15.3% of all households were made up of individuals, and 5.8% had someone living alone who was 65 years of age or older.  The average household size was 3.80 and the average family size was 4.12.

In the CDP, the population was spread out, with 38.4% under the age of 18, 11.7% from 18 to 24, 28.4% from 25 to 44, 16.0% from 45 to 64, and 5.6% who were 65 years of age or older.  The median age was 25 years. For every 100 females, there were 95.1 males.  For every 100 females age 18 and over, there were 97.6 males.

The median income for a household in the CDP was $18,276, and the median income for a family was $20,766. Males had a median income of $25,882 versus $23,750 for females. The per capita income for the CDP was $6,425.  About 36.4% of families and 39.9% of the population were below the poverty line, including 45.4% of those under age 18 and 31.1% of those age 65 or over.

History
Sacaton is one and one-quarter miles west of the 1858–1861 location of the Socatoon Station of the Butterfield Overland Mail.  The station was named for the nearby Maricopa village of Sacaton, four miles down the Gila from the station.
It was an adobe building established in 1858 on the Little Gila river also known as Capron's Rancho and was also a trading post.

Notable people
Ira Hayes – Pima Native American and United States Marine who assisted in raising the flag on Iwo Jima on February 23, 1945, was born and raised in the Sacaton area.
Mary Thomas – Governor of the Gila River Indian Community (1994–2000)

Historic structures and monuments

The following is a short description of the historic structures, cemetery and monuments pictured:
Side view of the C. H. Cook Memorial Church, a historic church on Church Street. It was built in 1918 and added to the National Register in 1975. The church is named after Charles Cook, a young missionary who arrived in Sacaton on December 23, 1870. The funeral of Ira Hayes was held here. The church was listed in the National Register of Historic Places as of August 28, 1975, reference # 75000359. In March 2019, an arsonist burned the church to the ground. The church was destroyed as a result of that fire.
The grave of Charles Cook's son, Franklin, who died on February 22, 1884, at the age of three months and six days. Lying next to the baby is Cook's wife, Annie M. Cook (Coates), who died on December 18, 1889. The grave is located in the C. H. Cook Memorial Church Cemetery on the northwest edge of the C. H. Cook Memorial Church. 
The grave of Mathew B. Juan whose body was interred in the cemetery on April 9, 1921. Juan's first name was misspelled; it is "Matthew". Juan was killed in World War I, as the first Native American from Arizona to die while fighting for the United States in a war. The grave is located in the C. H. Cook Memorial Church Cemetery, on the northwest edge of the C. H. Cook Memorial Church.
The grave of American Civil War veteran and Confederate Colonel James Patton Perkins, who died in Sweetwater, Arizona in 1896. The grave is located in the C. H. Cook Memorial Church Cemetery, on the northwest edge of the C. H. Cook Memorial Church.  
The Matthew B. Juan-Ira H. Hayes Veterans Memorial Park. The Memorial Park commemorates Matthew B. Juan, a Pima Indian who was the first Native American from Arizona to be killed in World War I. Ira Hayes was a Pima Indian who served in the United States Marine Corps, and is best known for his participation in the U.S. flag-raising at Iwo Jima in 1945. The park is located on West Casa Blanca Road in Sacaton.
The Pvt. Matthew B. Juan Monument built in 1928 by stonemason Michael Sullivan, in the Mathew B. Juan-Ira H. Hayes Veterans Memorial Park.
The Ira H. Hayes Monument in the Mathew B. Juan-Ira H. Hayes Veterans Memorial Park.
The First Pima Baptist Church a.k.a. "The first Southern Baptist Church", was built in 1925 and is located at N Voak AT W Casa Blanca Road. 
Early 20th Century House, located on Casa Blanca Road in the Gila Indian Reservation.

Historic structures pictured

The Gila River Japanese War Relocation Center

The Gila River War Relocation Center was an internment camp built by the War Relocation Authority (WRA) for the internment of Japanese Americans during the Second World War.  The Gila River War Relocation Memorial is located at Indian Route 24, Sacaton, Az. 
The Gila River War Relocation Memorial on Butte Mountain. 
Ruins of the Gila River Japanese Relocation Internment Camp.
A concrete slab foundation of the Gila River War Relocation Center.

See also
 Gila River Indian Community Emergency Medical Services
 Hohokam Pima National Monument

References

Gila River Indian Community
Seats of government of American Indian reservations
Census-designated places in Pinal County, Arizona